Athletes from the Netherlands competed at the 1912 Summer Olympics in Stockholm, Sweden. 33 competitors, all men, took part in 14 events in 7 sports.

Medalists

Bronze
 Adrianus de Jong, Willem van Blijenburgh, Jetze Doorman, Leonardus Salomonson and George van Rossem — Fencing, Men's Team Epee
 Willem van Blijenburgh, George van Rossem, Adrianus de Jong, Jetze Doorman, Dirk Scalongne and Hendrik de Iongh — Fencing, Men's Team Sabre
 Piet Bouman, Joop Boutmy, Nico Bouvy, Jan van Breda Kolff, Caesar ten Cate, Constant Feith, Ge Fortgens, Huug de Groot, Just Göbel, Bok de Korver, Dirk Lotsy, Jan van der Sluis, Jan Vos, David Wijnveldt, and Nico de Wolf — Football, Men's Team Competition

Athletics

A single athlete represented the Netherlands. It was the nation's second appearance in athletics. Grijseels did not advance to the final in either of his two events.

Ranks given are within that athlete's heat for running events.

Fencing

Twelve fencers represented the Netherlands. It was the third appearance of the nation in fencing, which had competed in the sport each time the nation had appeared at the Olympics. No Dutch fencer advanced to the final in an individual event, but both the épée and sabre teams advanced and won bronze medals. These two medals were the first fencing medals for the Netherlands.

Football

Roster

Piet BoumanJoop BoutmyNico BouvyHuug de GrootBok de KorverNico de WolfConstant FeithGe FortgensJust GöbelDirk LotsyCaesar ten CateJan van Breda KolffJan van der SluisJan VosDavid Wijnveldt

Round of 16

Quarterfinals

Semifinals

Bronze medal match

Final rank

Modern pentathlon 

The Netherlands had one competitor in the first Olympic pentathlon competition. Doorman did not begin the second phase of the pentathlon.

(The scoring system was point-for-place in each of the five events, with the smallest point total winning.)

Shooting 

A single shooter for the Netherlands competed. It was the nation's third appearance in shooting, which the Netherlands had competed each team the nation appeared at the Olympics.

Tennis 

A single tennis player represented the Netherlands at the 1912 Games. It was the nation's second appearance in tennis. Blom competed only in the outdoor singles, losing his first match.

 Men

Wrestling

Greco-Roman

The Netherlands was represented by three wrestlers in its second Olympic wrestling appearance. Sint had the best performance, going to the sixth round before being beaten twice. The team's combined record was 5-6.

References

External links
Official Olympic Reports
International Olympic Committee results database

Nations at the 1912 Summer Olympics
1912
Olympics